Wendy McGrath is a Canadian poet and novelist.

Career
"Broke City" (NeWest Press 2019) is the final novel in McGrath's Santa Rosa Trilogy. The second novel in the trilogy, North East (NeWest Press 2014) was nominated for the Georges Bugnet Prize for Fiction. The Santa Rosa Trilogy is set primarily in Edmonton, Alberta circa 1960s. Santa Rosa, the first book in the series, was nominated for the 2012 Robert Kroetsch City of Edmonton Book Prize.

McGrath released the EP "BOX" (spring 2017) with the group Quarto & Sound—made up of Edmonton musicians Sascha Liebrand, Yana Loo, and writer McGrath. "BOX" is an adaptation of McGrath's eponymous "mirror poem"—a genre-blurring collaboration of poetry, jazz, spoken word, instrumental experimental music, and voice. Quarto & Sound is currently working on an arrangement and adaptation of McGrath's long poem inspired by the North Saskatchewan River.

McGrath's most recent poetry collection is A Revision of Forward (NeWest Press 2015). The book is the culmination of a decade-long poetry/print collaboration with printmaker Walter Jule (who also contributed cover art for McGrath's first book common place ecstasies Beach Holme Publishing 2000). A Revision of Forward launched at Edmonton's SNAP Gallery in October, 2015. Natalie Olsen received an Honourable Mention Alcuin Society Award for Excellence in Book Design for her design work on the book, which incorporated image fragments from Jule's prints. 

Recurring Fictions (University of Alberta Press 2002), McGrath's first novel, is an experimental work chronicling the history of a Canadian family. The plot structure of this novel is non-linear, with shifts in narrative viewpoint and time. The first line of the novel, "Johnny Cash played the harmonica imitating the sound of trains" hints at one of the novel's recurring motifs. The often poetic style of this novel is multi-layered with spaces in the text and on pages providing literal and figurative openings for the reader to enter the world of the narrator(s). Short fragments of the text are also repeated at the bottom of some of the pages. 

Her first book of poetry, common place ecstasies (Beach Holme Publishing, 2000), explores themes of home, and childhood. A long poem, "Preserving," which is included in this collection was also published in chapbook form by Rubicon Press (February 2011). "Preserving" uses found portions of text extracted from a home canning pamphlet as a springboard for poetic narrative that tells the multi-generational story of prairie women. As noted on the Rubicon Press website: "McGrath's grandmother gave her that brochure and it was a palimpsest of sorts, with notes on the recipes and unexpected doodles penciled in. Publications like that brochure, as well as cookbooks, seemed to be in the background of her grandmothers' and her mother's lives when she was growing up. But, when she encountered these texts as an adult, their meaning became quite different."

McGrath's fiction and poetry has been broadcast on CBC Radio and has appeared in numerous literary journals. Her non-fiction has been published locally and nationally.

Sources 
 Colbert, Jade. "Wendy McGrath's Santa Rosa trilogy is done, and proves why she's a writer to pay attention to." Globe and Mail, October 2, 2019.
 <https://www.theglobeandmail.com/arts/books/reviews/article-wendy-mcgraths-santa-rosa-trilogy-is-done-and-proves-why-shes-a/> 

Living people
21st-century Canadian novelists
21st-century Canadian poets
Canadian women poets
Canadian women novelists
Year of birth missing (living people)
21st-century Canadian women writers